Mossi is a masculine given name. Notable people with the name include:

Mossi Issa Moussa (born 1993), Nigerien football player
Mossi Moussa (born 1992), Burundian football midfielder 
Mossi Raz (born 1965), Israeli politician

See also
Mosi (given name)

Masculine given names